The Nzoro River (or Nzaro, Obi, Zoro) is a river in the Democratic Republic of the Congo. It is a right tributary of the Kibali River. It is used to supply hydroelectric power to the Kibali Gold Mine.

Course

The Nzoro River originates in the extreme northeast of the country, near where the border with South Sudan joins the border with Uganda.
It follows a meandering course in a generally west direction to its junction with the Kibali downstream from Durba.
The Köppen climate classification is Aw: Tropical savanna, wet.

Human impact

The Logo people and Lugbara people live in the river basin.

In 1891 Guillaume Van Kerkhoven,  and Jules Milz travelled from Bumba up the Itimbiri and Likati, rivers, then overland to the Uele River in the region of Djabir. They then explored the Kibali and the Zoro.
They reached the Nile, but had to retreat to the Dungu region when they were attacked by Mahdists.

The Kibali Gold Mine, operated by Randgold, started operations in 2009.
The company installed a 20 MW hydroelectric power plant on the Nzoro River, and planned to install three more.
The power plants are on cataracts and provide run-of-the-river hydroelectricity, avoiding the need for dams.

Notes

Sources

Rivers of the Democratic Republic of the Congo